Ettore Guglieri (born 11 January 1984) is an Italian former professional footballer who played as a defender.

Club career
Guglieri joined to Fiorenzuola in 2014. On 16 February 2021, he played his 500th match for the club. On 16 July 2021 he renewed his contract and is the captain of the team. Guglieri retired in April 2022.

References

External links
 
 

1984 births
Living people
Sportspeople from the Province of Piacenza
Footballers from Emilia-Romagna
Italian footballers
Association football defenders
Serie C players
Serie D players
Piacenza Calcio 1919 players
A.S.D. AVC Vogherese 1919 players
A.S. Pizzighettone players
A.S.D. La Biellese players
U.S. Massese 1919 players
Calcio Lecco 1912 players
A.C. Carpenedolo players
A.C. Montichiari players
U.S. Fiorenzuola 1922 S.S. players